Dennis High School, also known as Dennis Elementary School and Dennis Primary School, is a historic high school building for African-American students located at Bishopville, Lee County, South Carolina. White students attended Bishopville High School, three blocks away. Although the law provided for a separate but equal education, $71,000 was allocated to build Bishopville for the whites while only Dennis was built for $17,000. The expenditures for student at BHS were $48.38 per student, but only $5.68 for each Black student at Dennis. When Dennis High School later burned down, the Black students were just made to double up with the elementary students for 12 years. Dennis was the only school in the county for black students, and no public bus service was provided until 1952.

The original L-shaped building is a one-story, load-bearing red brick Colonial Revival style structure that rests on a masonry foundation. Recessed symmetrical wings flank the main block. A third wing, which gave the building its original L-shape, houses the auditorium. A single classroom addition was built in 1954.

It was added to the National Register of Historic Places in 2005.

References

African-American history of South Carolina
High schools in South Carolina
School buildings on the National Register of Historic Places in South Carolina
Colonial Revival architecture in South Carolina
School buildings completed in 1936
Schools in Lee County, South Carolina
National Register of Historic Places in Lee County, South Carolina